Richmond is a city in eastern Wayne County, Indiana, United States. Bordering the state of Ohio, it is the county seat of Wayne County. In the 2020 census, the city had a population of 35,720. Situated largely within Wayne Township, its area includes a non-contiguous portion in nearby Boston Township, where Richmond Municipal Airport is currently located. It is the principal city of the Richmond micropolitan area.

Richmond is sometimes called the "cradle of recorded jazz" because the earliest jazz recordings and records were made at the studio of Gennett Records, a division of the Starr Piano Company. Gennett Records was the first to record such artists as Louis Armstrong, Bix Beiderbecke, Jelly Roll Morton, Hoagy Carmichael, Lawrence Welk, and Gene Autry. The city has twice received the All-America City Award, most recently in 2009.

History
In 1806 the first European Americans in the area, Quaker families from the state of North Carolina, settled along the East Fork of the Whitewater River. This was part of a general westward migration in the early decades after the American Revolution. John Smith was one of the earliest settlers. Richmond is still home to several Quaker institutions, including Friends United Meeting, Richmond Friends School, Earlham College and the Earlham School of Religion.

The first post office in Richmond was established in 1818 with Robert Morrison as the first postmaster. The town was officially incorporated in 1840, with John Sailor elected the first mayor.

Early cinema and television pioneer Charles Francis Jenkins grew up on a farm north of Richmond, where he began inventing useful gadgets. As the Richmond Telegram reported, on June 6, 1894, Jenkins gathered his family, friends and newsmen at his cousin's jewelry store in downtown Richmond and projected a filmed motion picture for the first time in front of an audience. The motion picture was of a vaudeville entertainer performing a butterfly dance, which Jenkins had filmed himself. Jenkins filed for a patent for the Phantoscope projector in November 1894 and it was issued in March 1895. A modified version of the Phantoscope was later sold to Thomas Edison, who named it Edison's Vitascope and began projecting motion pictures in New York City vaudeville theaters, raising the curtain on American cinema.

Joseph E. Maddy is credited with founding the country's first complete high school orchestra at Richmond, and later founded the National High School Orchestra Camp, which became the Interlochen Center for the Arts in Michigan.

Hoagy Carmichael recorded "Stardust" for the first time in Richmond at the Gennett recording studio. Famed trumpeter and singer Louis Armstrong was first recorded at Gennett as a member of King Oliver and his Creole Jazz Band. Many other internationally famous musicians recorded at Gennett's Richmond facility, including Jelly Roll Morton, Bix Beiderbecke, Duke Ellington, and Fats Waller. Gennett also recorded Klan musicians.

A group of artists in the area in the late 19th and early 20th centuries came to be known as the Richmond Group. They included John Elwood Bundy, Charles Conner, George Herbert Baker, Maude Kaufman Eggemeyer and John Albert Seaford. The Richmond Art Museum has a collection of regional and American art. Many consider the most significant painting in the collection to be a self-portrait of Indiana-born William Merritt Chase.

The city was connected to the National Road, the first road built by the federal government and a major route west for pioneers of the 19th century. It became part of the system of National Auto Trails. The highway is now known as U.S. Route 40. One of the extant Madonna of the Trail monuments was dedicated at Richmond on October 28, 1928. It sits in a corner of Glen Miller Park adjacent to US 40.

Richmond's cultural resources include two of Indiana's three Egyptian mummies. One is held by the Wayne County Historical Museum and the other by Earlham College's Joseph Moore Museum, leading to the local nickname "Mummy capital of Indiana".

The arts were supported by a strong economy increasingly based on manufacturing. Richmond was once known as "the lawnmower capital" because it was a center for manufacturing of lawnmowers from the late 19th century through the mid-20th century. Manufacturers included Davis, Motomower, Dille-McGuire and F&N. The farm machinery builder Gaar-Scott was based in Richmond. The Davis Aircraft Co., builder of a light parasol wing monoplane, operated in Richmond beginning in 1929.

After starting out in nearby Union City, Wayne Agricultural Works moved to Richmond. Wayne manufactured horse-drawn vehicles, including the "kid hack", a precursor of the motorized school bus. From the early 1930s through the 1940s, Richmond had several automobile designers and manufacturers. Among the automobiles locally manufactured were the Richmond, built by the Wayne Works; the "Rodefeld"; the Davis; the Pilot; the Westcott; and the Crosley.

In the 1950s Wayne Works changed its name to Wayne Corporation, by then a well-known bus and school-bus manufacturer. In 1967 it relocated to a site adjacent to Interstate 70. The company was a leader in school-bus safety innovations, but closed in 1992 during a period of school-bus manufacturing industry consolidations.

Richmond was known as the "Rose City" because of the many varieties once grown there by Hill's Roses. The company had several sprawling complexes of greenhouses, with a total of about  under glass. The annual Richmond Rose Festival honored the rose industry and was a popular summer attraction.

Downtown explosion

On April 6, 1968, an explosion triggered by a natural gas leak destroyed or damaged several downtown blocks and killed 41 people; more than 150 were injured. The event is documented in the book Death in a Sunny Street.

Geography

Richmond is located about 12 miles S of Hoosier Hill, the highest point in Indiana.

Demographics

2010 census
As of the census of 2010, there were 36,812 people, 15,098 households, and 8,909 families residing in the city. The racial makeup of the city was 83.9% White, 8.6% African American, 0.3% Native American, 1.1% Asian, 0.1% Pacific Islander, 1.9% from other races, and 4.0% from two or more races. Hispanic or Latino of any race were 4.1% of the population.

There were 15,098 households, of which 28.8% had children under the age of 18 living with them, 37.5% were married couples living together, 16.3% had a female householder with no husband present, 5.3% had a male householder with no wife present, and 41.0% were non-families. 34.2% of all households were made up of individuals, and 13.5% had someone living alone who was 65 years of age or older. The average household size was 2.29 and the average family size was 2.91.

The median age in the city was 38.4 years. 22.1% of residents were under the age of 18; 11.4% were between the ages of 18 and 24; 24.4% were from 25 to 44; 25.6% were from 45 to 64; and 16.5% were 65 years of age or older. The gender makeup of the city was 47.9% male and 52.1% female.

2000 census
As of the census of 2000, there were 39,124 people, 16,287 households, and 9,918 families residing in the city. The racial makeup of the city was 86.78% White, 8.87% African American, 0.27% Native American, 0.80% Asian, 0.06% Pacific Islander, 1.09% from other races, and 2.14% from two or more races. Hispanic or Latino of any race were 2.03% of the population.

There were 16,287 households, out of which 27.8% had children under the age of 18 living with them, 43.1% were married couples living together, 13.9% had a female householder with no husband present, and 39.1% were non-families. 33.0% of all households were made up of individuals, and 13.7% had someone living alone who was 65 years of age or older. The average household size was 2.29 and the average family size was 2.89.

In the city, the population was spread out, with 23.4% under the age of 18, 11.0% from 18 to 24, 27.5% from 25 to 44, 21.6% from 45 to 64, and 16.4% who were 65 years of age or older. The median age was 36 years. For every 100 females, there were 88.7 males. For every 100 females age 18 and over, there were 84.2 males.

The median income for a household in the city was $30,210, and the median income for a family was $38,346. Males had a median income of $30,849 versus $21,164 for females. The per capita income for the city was $17,096. About 12.1% of families and 15.7% of the population were below the poverty line, including 22.8% of those under age 18 and 10.8% of those age 65 or over.

Architecture
Richmond is noted for its rich stock of historic architecture. In 2003, a book entitled Richmond Indiana: Its Physical Development and Aesthetic Heritage to 1920 by Cornell University architectural historians, Michael and Mary Raddant Tomlan, was published by the Indiana Historical Society. Particularly notable buildings are the 1902 Pennsylvania Railroad Station designed by Daniel H. Burnham of Chicago and the 1893 Wayne County Court House designed by James W. McLaughlin of Cincinnati. Local architects of note include John A. Hasecoster, William S. Kaufman and Stephen O. Yates.

The significance of the architecture has been recognized. Five large districts, such as the Depot District, and several individual buildings are listed in the National Register of Historic Places, the Historic American Buildings Survey and the Historic American Engineering Record.

Educational institutions

Richmond has four colleges: Earlham College, Indiana University East, Ivy Tech Community College of Indiana, and the Purdue Polytechnic Institute – Richmond.
Richmond is home to two seminaries: Earlham School of Religion (Quaker) and Bethany Theological Seminary (Church of the Brethren)
Richmond High School includes the Richmond Art Museum and Civic Hall Performing Arts Center and the Tiernan Center, the 5th-largest high school gym in the United States.
Seton Catholic High School (founded 2002), a junior and senior high school, is a religious high school. It is based in the former home of St. Andrew High School (1899–1936) and, more recently, St. Andrew Elementary School, adjacent to St. Andrew Church of the Richmond Catholic Community.

The Richmond Japanese Language School (リッチモンド（IN）補習授業校 Ritchimondo(IN)Hoshū Jugyō Kō) a part-time Japanese school, holds its classes at the Highland Heights School.

The town has a lending library, the Morrisson Reeves Library.

Religious groups
Richmond is the headquarters of Friends United Meeting, and hosts the Quaker Hill Conference Center, of the Religious Society of Friends (Quakers).

Transportation

Air
Richmond Municipal Airport is a public-use airport five nautical miles (6 mi, 9 km) southeast of Richmond's central business district. It is owned by the Richmond Board of Aviation Commissioners. It is also an exclave of Richmond.

Richmond's closest airport with commercial service is Dayton International Airport, just under an hour's drive to the east. To the west is Indianapolis International Airport, which is slightly farther away.

Road
Richmond is served by Interstate 70 at exits 149, 151, 153, and 156. Public transit service is provided by city-owned Roseview Transit, operating daily except Sundays and major holidays.

Rail
Into the late 1960s Richmond's Pennsylvania Railroad station was a hub for Pennsylvania Railroad, and later, Penn Central, trains bound for Chicago, St. Louis, Kansas City, Indianapolis, Cincinnati and New York City. The last train at the station was Amtrak's National Limited (Kansas City - New York City).

Media
The daily newspaper is the Gannett-owned Palladium-Item.

Full-power radio stations include WKBV, WFMG, WQLK, WKRT, and Earlham College's student-run public radio station WECI. Richmond is also served by WJYW which is repeated on 94.5 and 97.7. Area NPR radio stations include WBSH in Hagerstown, Indiana, and WMUB in Oxford, OH.

Richmond is considered to be within the Dayton, Ohio, television market and has one full-power television station, WKOI, which is an Ion owned and operated station. The city also has one county-wide public, educational, and government access (PEG) cable television station, Whitewater Community Television.

Points of interest 

 Hayes Arboretum
 Wayne County Historical Museum
 Richmond Art Museum
 Indiana Football Hall of Fame
 Gaar Mansion (house museum)
 Joseph Moore Museum at Earlham College
 Glen Miller Park and Madonna of the Trail statue
 Richmond Downtown Historic District
 Old Richmond Historic District
 Starr Historic District
 Richmond Railroad Station Historic District
 Reeveston Place Historic District
 East Main Street-Glen Miller Park Historic District
 Don McBride Stadium baseball ballpark built in 1936
 Reid Memorial Presbyterian Church (Louis Comfort Tiffany-designed interior and windows, Hook and Hastings organ)
 Bethel AME Church (oldest AME church in Indiana: founded 1868)
 Old National Road Welcome Center (convention and tourism bureau)
 Whitewater Gorge Park and Gennett Walk of Fame
 Cardinal Greenway hiking trail
 Marceline Jones gravesite, Earlham Cemetery (Jim Jones's wife, who died in the Peoples Temple mass suicide)
 Richmond Civic Theatre (plays, classic movies, and children's theater)
 Madonna of the Trail statue at Glen Miller Park
 Gennett Records Walk of Fame

Notable people

 Mike Kitchel PR Dynamo/Celebrity

Sister cities
 Serpukhov, Russia
 Unnan, Shimane Prefecture, Japan

See also

Swayne, Robinson and Company

References

External links

 
 Morrison-Reeves Library Digital Collection
 Richmond/Wayne County Convention and Tourism Bureau Inc.
 

 
Cities in Indiana
County seats in Indiana
Micropolitan areas of Indiana
National Road
Populated places established in 1806
Cities in Wayne County, Indiana
1806 establishments in the United States